Castle Mill Stream is a backwater of the River Thames in the west of Oxford, England.  It is 5.5 km long.

Course
The stream leaves the main course of the River Thames at the south end of Port Meadow, immediately upstream of Medley Footbridge, split by the northern part of Fiddler's Island to the west. It flows between Port Meadow to the north and Cripley Meadow (largely allotments) to the south. It then passes under the Cherwell Valley railway line and turns south, alongside the southern end of the Oxford Canal and the railway tracks, across which is the Castle Mill graduate housing development of the University of Oxford.

Further south, the Isis Lock gives access to the Oxford Canal, and the short Sheepwash Channel leads west under the railway tracks to the main stream of the Thames. The stream then flows under Hythe Bridge, on Hythe Bridge Street, and under a series of bridges: Pacey's Bridge on Park End Street, Quaking Bridge, and Swan Bridge (once known as Castle Bridge), outside the original medieval city walls of Oxford, near Oxford Castle.  It continues under Oxpens Road and rejoins the Thames immediately upstream of the Gasworks Bridge.

History
The stream was altered greatly in Saxon and early Norman times. There was a mill here even before the castle existed. In the winter of 1142, there was a siege at the castle. Empress Matilda (aka Queen Maud, 1102–1167), the daughter and dispossessed heir of Henry I, was there during her power struggle with King Stephen (1096–1154). The queen escaped from the castle after her guards lowered her over the walls. She was clothed in a white dress that camouflaged her against the snow. Matilda crept through the enemy lines and across the Castle Mill Stream to escape to freedom.

In the Middle Ages, the stream was used for navigation, at least above Hythe Bridge. During the 16th century, hay, wood, stone, and slate were unloaded at a wharf at Hythe Bridge. When the Oxford Canal was built, it provided an easier route into the centre of Oxford, and in 1795-96 Daniel Harris built Isis Lock to allow Thames river traffic to access the canal wharves. The stream then fell out of use for navigation.

Gallery

See also
 Castle Mill, an Oxford University graduate housing complex

References

External links
 
 Where Thames Smooth Waters Glide: Oxford Old River

Geography of Oxford
History of Oxford
Rivers of Oxfordshire
0CastleMillStream